GJU may refer to:
 German Jordanian University, in Madaba, Jordan
 Guru Jambheshwar University of Science and Technology, in Hisar, Haryana, India